Acosta is a Spanish and Portuguese surname. Originally it was used to refer to a person who lived by the seashore or was from the mountains (encostas). It comes from the Portuguese da Costa (cognate of English "coast", literally translates as "of the coast"), which in Spanish became de Acosta; the exact Spanish counterpart of da Costa is "de la Costa". Notable people with the surname include:

Agustín Acosta (baseball), Cuban baseball player
Alberto Acosta (born 1966), Argentine footballer
Rene Alexander Acosta (born 1969), American attorney and United States Secretary of Labor 2017–2019
Alda Ribiero Acosta (contemporary), American terrorist in Uruguay
Allan Acosta, American engineer
Armando Acosta (contemporary), doom metal drummer, former member of the band Saint Vitus
Bertrand Blanchard Acosta (1895–1954), American aviator who flew in the Spanish Civil War
Beto Acosta (born 1977), Uruguayan footballer
Carlos Acosta (contemporary), Cuban ballet dancer
Cecilio Acosta (1818–1881), Venezuelan writer 
Cristóbal Acosta (1515–1580), Portuguese physician and natural historian
 Ed Acosta (born 1944), Panamanian Major League Baseball pitcher
Eliades Acosta (born 1959), Cuban politician
Jim Acosta (born 1971), CNN senior White House correspondent 
Joaquín Acosta (1800s), Colombian explorer and author
Joe Acosta (born 1950), Puerto Rican salsa piano player
José de Acosta (1540–1600), Spanish Jesuit missionary and historian to Latin America
José Julián Acosta (1825–1891), Puerto Rican journalist and abolitionist
Josephine Acosta Pasricha (1945–), Filipino Indologist and translator
Juan F. Acosta (1890–1968), Puerto Rican composer and music teacher
Julio Acosta García (1872–1954), President of Costa Rica 1920–1924
Lautaro Acosta (born 1988), Argentine footballer
Leopoldo Acosta (born 1962), Ecuadorian track and field athlete
Luciano Acosta (born 1994), Argentine footballer
Mae Acosta (born ), Filipino singer and SexBomb Girls member.
Manuel Gregorio Acosta (1921–1989), Mexican-American painter
Manuel da Costa (1541–1604), Portuguese Jesuit priest, teacher, and missionary
Manny Acosta (born 1981) Panamian baseball player
Marta Acosta, American fiction writer
Martha Acosta (contemporary), Peruvian politician and congresswoman
Mercedes de Acosta (1893–1968), Spanish-American poet, playwright, and designer
Nelson Acosta (1944–), Uruguayan football player and coach
Óscar Acosta (1933–), Honduran writer, critic, politician and diplomat
Oscar Zeta Acosta (1935–1974), American attorney, author, politician, and activist
Pablo Acosta Villarreal, Mexican drug lord
Pedro Acosta (born 1959), Venezuelan football (soccer) defender
Pedro Acosta (born 2004), Spanish motorcycle racer
Persida Acosta, Filipino attorney.
Raúl Acosta (born 1962), Colombian road cyclist
Rodolfo Acosta (1920–1974), Mexican character actor 
Santiago Acosta (born 1979), Argentine flyweight boxer
Santos Acosta (1828–1901), President of Colombia 1867–1868
St. Elmo W. Acosta (1900s), American politician from Jacksonville, Florida
 Teolindo Acosta (1937–2004), Venezuelan professional baseball player
Tomás Diez Acosta (born 1946), Cuban revolutionary, teacher, and author
Uriel da Costa (1585–1640), Portuguese philosopher and skeptic

Other
Acosta (crater), lunar crater named after Cristóbal Acosta
Acosta Bridge, bridge in Jacksonville, Florida named after St. Elmo W. Acosta
Acosta (canton)
Acosta Inc., Sales & Marketing company in Jacksonville, Florida
Acosta (manufacturer), German catering equipment and coffee machine factory

Spanish-language surnames

zh:新浪博客#人物 Acosta